The women's freestyle 53 kg freestyle wrestling competition at the 2018 Commonwealth Games in Gold Coast, Australia was held on 12 April at the Carrara Sports and Leisure Centre.

Results
Legend
F — Won by fall

References

Wrestling at the 2018 Commonwealth Games
Com